Ashuapmushuan Lake is a freshwater body of the Lac-Ashuapmushuan, Quebec unorganized territory of the Regional County Municipality (MRC) Le Domaine-du-Roy, north-west of Saguenay-Lac-Saint-Jean administrative region, in province of Quebec, Canada.

This lake is fully contained in the township of Lorne and the Ashuapmushuan Wildlife Reserve.

Forestry is the main economic activity of the sector. Recreational tourism activities come second.

The forest road route 167 linking Chibougamau and Saint-Félicien, Quebec passes to the northeast of the lake, as well as the Canadian National Railway. Other secondary forest roads serve the vicinity of the lake.

The surface of Ashuapmushuan Lake is usually frozen from early November to mid-May, however, safe ice movement is generally from mid-November to mid-April.

Geography

Toponymy
On the peninsula at the northwestern end of the lake, at the confluence of the Marquette River, Normandin River, and Ashuapmushuan River, a trading post was built in the early eighteenth century. It has been in operation for several decades.

In the Ilnue language, ashuapmushuan means "where moose are being watched". Since the late nineteenth century, a dozen different spellings of the name of this body of water has been noted, whose form "Lac Chamouchouan" noted on a map of 1897.

The toponym "Lac Ashuapmushuan" was formalized on October 5, 1982, by the Commission de toponymie du Québec.

Notes and references

See also 

Lakes of Saguenay–Lac-Saint-Jean
Le Domaine-du-Roy Regional County Municipality